Andrea Boattini (born 16 September 1969) is an Italian astronomer and a prolific discoverer of minor planets and comets.

Career 

After developing a growing interest in minor planets, he graduated in 1996 from the University of Bologna with a thesis on near-Earth objects (NEOs). He is involved in various projects related to NEO follow-up and search programs, with special interest in the NEO class known as Atens.

He currently works at the Lunar and Planetary Laboratory, University of Arizona after many years spent at the Consiglio Nazionale delle Ricerche (CNR, National Research Council) and the Astronomical Observatory in Rome. He worked for the Catalina Sky Survey project from 2007 to 2014, in Tucson, Arizona (USA). Meanwhile, he discovered the active comets C/2007 W1 (Boattini), C/2008 J1 (Boattini), C/2008 S3 (Boattini), C/2009 P2 (Boattini), C/2009 W2 (Boattini), C/2010 F1 (Boattini), C/2010 G1 (Boattini) as well as the most distant discovery of an inbound active comet, C/2010 U3 (Boattini).  He also accidentally recovered 206P/Barnard-Boattini from the Mount Lemmon Survey (also see lost comet).

Honors 

Asteroid 8925 Boattini is named in his honour. The official  was published by the Minor Planet Center (MPC) on 2 February 1999.

List of discovered minor planets 

Andrea Boattini is credited by the MPC with the discovery of hundreds of minor planets made between 1977 (see following comment) and 2006.

The minor planet , discovered at the Siding Spring Observatory on 17 September 1977, is credited by the MPC to Andrea Boattini and his older co-discoverer Giuseppe Forti (born 1939). However Boattini did not co-discover this asteroid on the day after his 8th birthday in 1977, but rather recovered the body from the original observations, referenced as MPS 18832, which were published by the MPC on 13 October 2000. He named the asteroids  12848 Agostino and 14973 Rossirosina, in honor of his father Agostino (born 1932) and his mother, Rosina Rossi Boattini (born 1934).

His co-discoverers are:  M. Tombelli,  V. Goretti,  A. Di Paola,  L. Tesi,  G. Forti,  G. D'Abramo,  F. Pedichini,  A. Caronia,  A. Di Clemente,  F. Bernardi,  V. Cecchini,  H. Scholl,  M. Mazzucato.

{| class="wikitable collapsible collapsed" role="presentation" style="width:100%; background:#ffffff;"
|-
!List of minor planets discovered by Andrea Boattini
|-
| align="center" |

List of discovered comets 

Andrea Boattini has also discovered or re-discovered 25 comets (see table).

See also

References

External links 
 Homepage
 BBC

1969 births
Living people
20th-century Italian astronomers
Discoverers of asteroids
Discoverers of comets

21st-century Italian astronomers
University of Bologna alumni
National Research Council (Italy) people